Poverty Inc. is a 2014 film by Gary Null and Valerie Van Cleve which "claims that the Federal Reserve, like other central banks such as the International Monetary Fund and the World Bank, is a pyramid scheme."

The film, characterised as an "advocacy documentary", looks at the signing of the 1913 Federal Reserve Act by Woodrow Wilson and the demise of the Glass-Steagall Act, which it asserts "effectively turned Goldman Sachs from a financial casino into a commercial bank with full government coverage". The Federal Reserve is portrayed as "an unconstitutional lobbying body for commercial banks that prints money out of thin air".

Critical reception
The Village Voice said that "Null’s movie [...] utterly fails to inform or guide. Every speaker seems to traffic in exclamation points, pretty much the only points that are made", characterising it as "a nightmare of attention deficit and hyperactivity" and "devoid of backup and evidence". The Los Angeles Times noted "sound bites indiscriminately collected from the likes of Ralph Nader and former Rep. Dennis Kucinich as well as seemingly random folks like a family doctor and the owner of a vintage clothing store". The New York Times said of the film that "it's not pleasant to be bludgeoned with rhetoric even if you subscribe to the film's premise".

References

External links 

 Gary Null Films  - Poverty Inc. About the Film
 Poverty Inc. at Imdb

2014 documentary films
2014 films
American documentary films
American independent films
Films directed by Gary Null
2010s English-language films
2010s American films